Pinnaduwage Chaturanga de Silva (born 17 January 1990), or Chaturanga de Silva, is a professional Sri Lankan cricketer who plays limited over cricket. Chathuranga de Silva was educated at St. Aloysius College, Galle, where he started his cricket career. He is primarily a left-handed batsman but bowls handy slow left-arm orthodox. He has represented the Sri Lanka national cricket team in limited over international matches. He is the elder brother of Sri Lankan All-rounder Wanindu Hasaranga de Silva.

Personal life
 His younger brother Wanindu Hasaranga is also a limited overs cricketer, who debuted on 2 July 2017 against Zimbabwe.

Domestic career
In March 2018, he was named in Galle's squad for the 2017–18 Super Four Provincial Tournament. The following month, he was also named in Galle's squad for the 2018 Super Provincial One Day Tournament.

In August 2018, he was named in Colombo's squad the 2018 SLC T20 League. In February 2019, Sri Lanka Cricket named him as the Player of the Tournament of the 2017–18 SLC Twenty20 Tournament. In March 2019, he was named in Kandy's squad for the 2019 Super Provincial One Day Tournament. In October 2020, he was drafted by the Jaffna Stallions for the inaugural edition of the Lanka Premier League. In August 2021, he was named in the SLC Greys team for the 2021 SLC Invitational T20 League tournament. In November 2021, he was selected to play for the Jaffna Kings following the players' draft for the 2021 Lanka Premier League. In July 2022, he was signed by the Dambulla Giants for the third edition of the Lanka Premier League.

International career
De Silva was first selected in the Sri Lankan squad for the series against South Africa. He made his ODI debut for Sri Lanka against Pakistan in the Asia Cup on 25 February 2014. In the match, he took four wickets in a winning course. Then in the next match against Bangladesh, he scored 44 runs.

He was named in Sri Lanka's Twenty20 International (T20I) squad for their series against Pakistan in July 2015, but did not play any match. In October 2017, he was named in Sri Lanka's T20I squad for their series against Pakistan. He made his T20I debut for Sri Lanka against Pakistan on 29 October 2017.

References 

1990 births
Living people
Sri Lankan cricketers
Sri Lanka One Day International cricketers
Sri Lanka Twenty20 International cricketers
Asian Games medalists in cricket
Cricketers at the 2014 Asian Games
Moors Sports Club cricketers
Basnahira cricketers
Kurunegala Warriors cricketers
Victoria Sporting Club cricketers
Asian Games gold medalists for Sri Lanka
Sylhet Strikers cricketers
Medalists at the 2014 Asian Games
Jaffna Kings cricketers